King An was the 3rd king of Mahan confederacy. He reigned from 189 BCE to 157 BCE. His true name was An. He was succeeded by Hye of Samhan (Hye Wang).

References

See also 
 List of Korean monarchs
 History of Korea

Monarchs of the Mahan confederacy
2nd-century BC Korean people